Thaumastocyonini is an extinct tribe of large, carnivorous mammals (bone-crushers) known as bear dogs, of the family Amphicyonidae, subfamily Amphicyoninae, which inhabited Europe during the Miocene living from ~16.9—7.25 Ma and existed for approximately . It was originally erected to include only the genus Agnotherium, and is no longer used.

References

Tortonian extinctions
Bear dogs
Burdigalian first appearances